Hürup is a municipality in the district of Schleswig-Flensburg, in Schleswig-Holstein, Germany. It is situated approximately 7 km southeast of Flensburg.

Hürup is the seat of the Amt of Hürup.

References

Schleswig-Flensburg